Paracrossochilus vittatus is a species of cyprinid in the genus Paracrossochilus. Its habitat is fast flowing freshwater and it is considered harmless to humans.

References

Cyprinid fish of Asia
Fish of Indonesia